This is a list of allergies, which includes the allergen, potential reactions, and a brief description of the cause where applicable.

Allergens

Food

Medical

Environmental

Contact

Many substances can cause an allergic reaction when in contact with the human integumentary system.

See also 

 Allergic inflammation
 Elimination diet
 Food intolerance
 Oral allergy syndrome
 List of inclusion bodies that aid in diagnosis of cutaneous conditions
 List of cutaneous conditions
 List of genes mutated in cutaneous conditions
 List of target antigens in pemphigus
 List of specialized glands within the human integumentary system

References

Further reading 

 
 
  A collection of resources on the topic of food allergies and intolerances.

Effects of external causes
Allergology
Pulmonology
Gastroenterology
Immune system disorders
Food allergies
Dermatology-related lists